Uri Bin Nun is an Israeli inventor. He served as CEO of the Israel Electric Corporation.

Business career
Uri Bin Nun succeeded Jacob Razon as CEO of the Israel Electric Corporation on March 20, 2006. He resigned in 2007 following months of disagreements with the government and the company's board of directors over the planned reform of the electricity company.

Bin Nun has applied for five patents, including one for a regenerator matrix and one for a refrigeration device with an improved DC motor.

References

External links

Israeli inventors
Living people
Year of birth missing (living people)
Israeli Jews
Energy in Israel
Israeli businesspeople